Mari Mahr (born 1941) is a Hungarian-British photographer. She was born in Santiago, Chile where her Hungarian Jewish parents had fled during World War II. After the war, the family moved back to Budapest. Mahr was inspired to study journalism by Jean-Luc Godard's film À Bout de Souffle. She also became a trainee press photographer. In 1973 she moved to London and continued her photography studies at the Polytechnic of Central London (now the University of Westminster). She has lived and worked in London ever since.

Mahr has had over 60 exhibitions around the world. The British Council staged Mahr retrospectives in her countries of origin Hungary and Chile. She received the Fox Talbot Award from the National Museum of Photography, Film and Television in 1989. A book titled Between Ourselves: The Photographs of Mari Mahr was published in 1998, featuring contributions by Amanda Hopkinson.

References

External links
 Mari Mahr website
 autobiographical note

1941 births
People from Santiago
British women photographers
Hungarian women photographers
Hungarian photographers
Living people